KMXK (94.9 FM) is a commercial radio station in St. Cloud, Minnesota airing a hot adult contemporary format. The station is owned by Townsquare Media. The station's studios, along with Townsquare's other St. Cloud stations, are located at 640 Lincoln Avenue SE, on St. Cloud's east side. The transmitter is located south of Cold Spring.

History

The station was previously licensed to Litchfield, Minnesota, about 19 miles from its transmitter near Cold Spring. The call letters were KLFD. It was owned by the Litchfield Broadcast Corporation The station's call letters are now in use by a radio station in Litchfield.

References

External links
Mix 94.9 official website

Radio stations in St. Cloud, Minnesota
Radio stations established in 1968
Hot adult contemporary radio stations in the United States
Townsquare Media radio stations